Necoclí Airport  is a general aviation airport serving the town of Necoclí in the Antioquia Department of Colombia. There are no scheduled flights.

See also

Transport in Colombia
List of airports in Colombia

References

External links
OpenStreetMap - Necoclí
Necoclí Airport

Airports in Colombia